William Warrender Mackenzie, 1st Baron Amulree,  (19 August 1860 – 5 May 1942), known as Sir William Mackenzie between 1918 and 1929, was a British barrister, public servant and Labour (later National Labour) politician. He served as Secretary of State for Air under Ramsay MacDonald between 1930 and 1931.

He later chaired the Newfoundland Royal Commission, which reported on the future governance of the Dominion of Newfoundland.

Early life
Amulree was the son of Robert (Robyn) Mackenzie, of Scone, Perthshire, and Jean, daughter of Basil Menzies. He was educated at the University of Edinburgh and was called to the Bar from Lincoln's Inn in 1886.

Public career
Mackenzie published The Overseer's Handbook in 1889 and became a King's Counsel in 1914. In 1918 he became Chairman of the Committee on Production, a position he held until 1919. He was then President of the Industrial Court between 1919 and 1926 and Chairman of the National Wages Board for Railways between 1920 and 1926, of the Industrial Delegation to Canada and the USA between 1926 and 1927, and of the Departmental Committee on the Shop Hours Act 1927. He was promoted within the Order of the British Empire to be a Knight Grand Cross (GBE).

Political career
In 1929 Mackenzie was raised to the peerage as Baron Amulree, of Strathbraan in the County of Perth, giving him a seat in the House of Lords and the possibility of joining the government. In October 1930, he was appointed as Secretary of State for Air in Ramsay MacDonald's second Labour government, succeeding the deceased Lord Thomson, with a seat in the cabinet, and at the same time was sworn into the Privy Council. He was one of the few Labour politicians to follow MacDonald into the coalition National Government, in which he kept his post, although not his seat on the Cabinet, until the reconstruction of the government after the November 1931 general election.

In 1933, Amulree chaired the Newfoundland Royal Commission, which prepared a report on the future of Newfoundland as a dominion of the British Empire.

Personal life
Amulree married Lilian, daughter of W. H. Bradbury, in 1897. She died at Cheam, Surrey, in June 1916. Amulree died in May 1942, aged 81, and was succeeded in the barony by his son Basil, who became a distinguished physician.

Honours
In 1917 Amulree was appointed as a Commander of the Order of the British Empire (CBE) and in 1918 promoted in the same Order to a Knight Commander (KBE), making him Sir William Mackenzie.

References

External links 
 

1860 births
1942 deaths
Secretaries of State for Air (UK)
Alumni of the University of Edinburgh
1
British King's Counsel
British people of Scottish descent
Members of the Privy Council of the United Kingdom
Knights Grand Cross of the Order of the Bath
Knights Commander of the Order of the British Empire
Labour Party (UK) hereditary peers
20th-century King's Counsel
Barons created by George V